The 2021 ACC men's basketball tournament (officially the 2021 ACC Men's Basketball Tournament Presented by New York Life) was the postseason men's basketball tournament for the Atlantic Coast Conference and held at the Greensboro Coliseum in Greensboro, North Carolina, from March 9 to 13, 2021. It was the 68th annual edition of the tournament.

The 2021 Atlantic Coast Conference basketball tournament was originally scheduled to be hosted at the Capital One Arena in Washington, D.C. However, due to the ongoing COVID-19 pandemic, the tournament was moved to the Greensboro Coliseum in Greensboro, North Carolina, on November 24, 2020. Capital One Arena will host the tournament in 2024.

Virginia and Duke elected to withdraw from the tournament due to some of their players testing positive for COVID-19.

The tournament final was the second-ever ACC championship game, and the first since Georgia Tech beat Virginia in 1990, to feature no teams from the state of North Carolina.

Seeds

All 15 ACC teams were scheduled to participate in the tournament.  Teams were seeded by record within the conference, with a tiebreaker system to seed teams with identical conference records. The top four seeds received double byes, while seeds 5 through 9 received single byes.

Schedule

Bracket

Game summaries

First round

Second round

Quarterfinals

Semifinals

Final

Awards and honors

Source:

Tournament MVP: Michael Devoe, Georgia Tech

All-Tournament Teams:

First Team
Jose Alvarado, Georgia Tech
Armando Bacot, North Carolina
Buddy Boeheim, Syracuse
Michael Devoe, Georgia Tech
Balsa Koprivica, Florida State

Second Team
Scottie Barnes, Florida State
Kameron McGusty, Miami (FL)
Jordan Usher, Georgia Tech
Mark Williams, Duke
Isaiah Wong, Miami (FL)

See also
 2021 ACC women's basketball tournament

Notes

References

External links
 2021 ACC men's basketball tournament

Tournament
ACC men's basketball tournament
Basketball competitions in Greensboro, North Carolina
College basketball tournaments in North Carolina
ACC men's basketball tournament
ACC men's basketball tournament